Body Language is the second studio album by Cuban-American singer Ana, released by Parc Records and Epic Records in 1990. It features the singles "Got to Tell Me Something" and "Angel of Love", the latter featuring a duet with Jordan Knight of New Kids on the Block. The album was mainly produced by NKOTB's manager Maurice Starr and includes two songs written and produced by Debbie Gibson and two songs co-written and co-produced by former Miami Sound Machine drummer Kiki Garcia.

The album was made available on streaming platforms on January 28, 2022, with six bonus tracks.

Track listing 
All tracks are produced by Maurice Starr, except where indicated.

Personnel 
 Eddie (M.C. Rad) Montilla – keyboards (A1, B2)
 Gary Corbett – keyboards (B1)
 Debbie Gibson – programming, backing vocals (B5)
 Tony Coluccio – programming (B5)
 Leo Rizzo – keyboards (B1)
 Tommy Williams – guitar (B1)
 Ira Siegel – guitar (B5)
 Kirk Powers Burkhardt – bass (B1)
 Fred Levine – drums (B1, B5)
 Adam Tese – percussion (B1)
 Bashiri Johnson – percussion (B5)
 Kiki Garcia – backing vocals (A1, B2)
 Hector Almaguer – backing vocals (A1, B2)
 Carrie Johnson – backing vocals (B1, B5)
 Libby Johnson – backing vocals (B1, B5)

References

External links 
 
 

1990 albums
Epic Records albums